Blue Corner is a section of Palau's barrier reef in the south-east of Koror, close to Ngerukewid and German Channel. Its triangular shape, with step walls on the Pacific Ocean sides, resembles a submerged peninsula. In the north part of the Blue Corner, there is a large underwater cavern called Blue Holes. Due to a high variety of corals and wildlife in the area, the Blue Corner is a popular recreational dive site. It is variously called "the most requested dive in Palau" and "one of the most action-packed scuba dive sites in the world."

See also
Rock Islands
German Channel

References

Reefs of the Pacific Ocean
Underwater diving sites of Palau
Koror